Euderces velutinus is a long-horned beetle native to Central America. It is a good ant mimic of the conspicuous species Camponotus sericeiventris.

Description
E. velutinus is about 1 cm long and 3 mm wide. The general color is black, with short golden hairs on top, patterned in a ways such that it resembles an ant. The hind legs are shaped ant-like. The beetle's head and prothorax together mimic the ant's head, with a pair of black spots simulating the eyes.

It is very similar to E. magnus, but is smaller, has a shorter pronotum, and has the entire apical half of the elytra densely clothed with silky, golden yellow pubescence, which helps giving the impression of C. sericeiventris.

Distribution
E. velutinus has been found in Guatemala and Honduras.

See also
 Myrmecotypus — a spider genus with one species also mimicking C. sericeiventris

References

External links 
 Photographs of E. velutinus

Euderces
Beetles of Central America
Beetles described in 1931